Comet C/1993 Y1 (McNaught–Russell) is a long (time) period comet that reached a maximum magnitude of 6.5 (just below naked eye level) in early 1994. It was discovered by Robert H. McNaught and Kenneth S. Russell using the U.K. Schmidt Telescope in Australia. McNaught and Russell worked at Siding Spring Observatory and together discovered five comets between 1991 and 1995.

Orbit 
Its orbital period was found to be very high – initially estimated at over 1400 years.

Historical records 
It was noted by Francois Colas (Paris observatory)  and Ichiro Hasegawa  that the path of the comet coincided with a comet C/574 G1 recorded in AD 574 over a period from April 4 to May 23 by observers in China. This would give the comet a period of 1430 ± 30 years and so making it the longest period comet to be seen on two separate returns. Since the comet was not observed to approach any planets, its orbit should remain largely unchanged on its next return. This would place its next approach to the inner Solar System in the 3400s.

References 

Non-periodic comets
1993 in science